Holiday is the second full-length release studio album from electronic group, Alaska in Winter.

Track listing
 "We Are Blind and Riding the Merry-Go-Round" – 4:33
 "Berlin" – 6:11
 "Speed Boat to Heaven" – 5:07
 "Highlander Pt. 1" – 3:56
 "Highlander Pt. 2" – 3:31
 "Knorrpromenade" – 4:09
 "Streetgang Pt. 1" – 3:21
 "Streetgang Pt. 2" – 2:52
 "Streetgang Pt. 3" – 2:41
 "Keep Your Boots Clean and Everything You Step on Is Dirt" – 3:56
 "Close Your Eyes (Remix)" – 5:24
 "Horsey Horse Pt 2" (Bonus track on European release) – 3:13

Personnel

Brandon Bethancourt - Vocals, Keyboards

2008 albums
Alaska in Winter albums